Nancy Wang is an American cloud technology executive and philanthropist.  She has led product development at Google, Rubrik, and Amazon, while also founding and serving as the CEO of Advancing Women in Tech (AWIT).  She has received multiple awards and has multiple patents pending.

Early life 
Wang grew up in Wisconsin. She was admitted to the University of Pennsylvania, where she was a Trustee Scholar and a Benjamin Franklin Honor Scholar.  She graduated with a bachelor's degree in Computer Science, while also studying European History.

Career 
After graduation, Wang performed data system integration for the United States government, including the United States Intelligence Community.

From 2014 to 2016, Wang worked at Google Fiber, where she led network infrastructure product development. At that time, she was the first and only female product manager there, as well as the youngest product manager of any gender.

From 2017 to 2019, Wang served as lead product manager at the Silicon Valley unicorn Rubrik.

At time of publication, Wang serves as the General Manager of Data Protection and Governance services at Amazon Web Services.

Impact

Women in Technology 
With nearly a decade of work experience in infrastructure product management and engineering under her belt, Wang has witnessed firsthand how few women there are in the technology industry. Her experiences in this heavily male-dominated field have fueled her passion for achieving gender equity in technology.

In 2017, Wang founded Advancing Women in Product (AWIP), now Advancing Women in Tech (AWIT), a 501(c)(3) nonprofit organization to promote gender equality of opportunity in the technology sector through skills-based education, networking, and mentorship.

Thought Leadership 
Through her various roles and contributions to discourse on topics ranging from data governance to gender equality in tech to product management, Wang has established herself as a prominent thought leader. She is an expert contributor for Forbes and Built In and has been featured in a number of podcasts and interviews.

Wang is also passionate about the democratization of high-quality engineering education of the type taught internally at Google and Amazon, and has developed a series of online courses on real-world product management and technical skills.

Wang spearheaded the creation of the Executives In Residence program at the University of Pennsylvania's School of Engineering and Applied Science and is developing a growing network for supporting students and alumni advance their careers in software engineering.

References 

Living people
Year of birth missing (living people)
University of Pennsylvania alumni
Product designers
American women in business
21st-century American women